McCauleyville may refer to:

McCauleyville, Minnesota, an unincorporated community
McCauleyville Township, Wilkin County, Minnesota